Sudair or Sudayr is a historical region in Najd in the central of Saudi Arabia, and is located approximately 150 km north of the Saudi capital, Riyadh.  The region lies in a valley directly to the east of the Tweig escarpment, which runs across Najd starting from Sudair in the north and ending near Wadi ad-Dawasir in the south.

Before the modern era, the region, like most others in Najd, depended on the valley's ability to retain rainwater, and its people mainly subsisted on the cultivation of grains and dates. Families of farmers were ruled by local Emirs in their various settlements around Sudair before the modern era.

The local variety of dates in Sudair is known as kudry, and is darker in color and has a stronger flavor than other varieties of dates grown in the country.  Graded as low quality locally due to its commonality, the kudry is highly prized abroad and around other regions of Arabia.

Sudair's towns and villages include  Harmah, Al Majma'ah , Al-Janobiyah, Hautat Sudair, Arrawdah, Addakhlah, Al-Ma'ashbah, Jalajil, Tumair, Al-Khotamah, Attwaim, Oshairah, al Awdah, Attar, Junaifi, and Al Hayer.
 
A large-scale petrochemical complex is currently being constructed near Sudair. Upon completion, the project is expected to be on the magnitude of the industrial complexes of Jubail, and will serve as a bridge between the industrial zones of Jubail on the east coast and Yanbu on the west.
Historical regions in Saudi Arabia]

Famous Sudairawis
Sudairi Seven (Maternal)
Adel al-Jubeir
Rajwa Al Saif (Daughter of the Sheikh of Attar in Sudair and the wife of Crown Prince of Jordan)
Abdulaziz al-Tuwaijri

See also
Sudair Industrial City
Sudairi Seven

Geography of Saudi Arabia